Pier Paolo Scarrone (born 26 June 1951 in Alessandria) is an Italian former professional footballer who played as a midfielder.

He played 2 seasons (3 games, 1 goal which he scored on his professional debut for A.C. Milan against Cagliari in Serie A).

Honours
 Coppa Italia winner: 1971/72.

References

1951 births
Living people
People from Alessandria
Association football midfielders
Italian footballers
Serie A players
A.C. Milan players
Genoa C.F.C. players
S.S.C. Bari players
Parma Calcio 1913 players
Reggina 1914 players
U.S. Alessandria Calcio 1912 players
Casale F.B.C. players
U.S.D. Novese players
A.S.D. La Biellese players
Footballers from Piedmont
Sportspeople from the Province of Alessandria